Gabe Mastromatteo (born August 20, 2002) is a Canadian competitive swimmer who specializes in the breastroke.

Career 
In 2017, Mastromatteo was part of the gold medal team that won the 4x100 mixed medley at the 2017 World Junior Swimming Championships. In 2019, Mastromatteo won 3 medals at the 2019 World Junior Swimming Championships in Budapest, including an individual silver medal in the 50 m breaststroke.

As part of the 2021 Canadian Olympic swimming trials in Toronto, Mastromatteo won the 100 m breaststroke race. This qualified him for the 2020 Summer Olympics in Tokyo. He placed thirty-eighth in the heats of the 100 m breaststroke, his lone individual event. He stated his main focus was on the 4x100 m medley relay, where the Canadian men's team made the final and placed seventh, with Mastromatteo swimming a new personal best relay time on the breaststroke leg.

References

External links
 
 
 
 

2002 births
Living people
Sportspeople from Kenora
Swimmers at the 2020 Summer Olympics
Swimmers at the 2018 Summer Youth Olympics
Canadian male breaststroke swimmers